Shubenacadie may refer to:

 Shubenacadie, Nova Scotia, an unincorporated community in Hants County, Nova Scotia
 Shubenacadie River
 Shubenacadie Valley
 Shubenacadie Grand Lake